"The Girls' Song" is a song written by Jimmy Webb and performed by The 5th Dimension.  The song was produced by Bones Howe and arranged by Webb.  It was featured on their 1967 album, The Magic Garden, but was not released as a single until its release from their 1970 album, Greatest Hits.

Chart performance
It reached #6 on the U.S. adult contemporary chart, #43 on the Billboard Hot 100, and #97 in Australia in 1970.

Other versions
A version of the song by Jackie DeShannon was featured on the 2003 album, Tunesmith: The Songs of Jimmy Webb
A version of the song by The Spencer Davis Group was featured on the 2016 album, Taking Out Time Complete Recordings 1967-1969

References

1967 songs
1970 singles
Songs written by Jimmy Webb
The 5th Dimension songs
Jackie DeShannon songs
Song recordings produced by Bones Howe